Kuindzhi Art Museum (Ukrainian: Художній музей імені Куїнджі) was an art museum located in the city of Mariupol in Ukraine. It is dedicated to the display of the life and works of the artist Arkhip Kuindzhi, who was born in the city. The museum opened on 30 October 2010, however its creation was proposed almost a century earlier.

The museum was destroyed by an airstrike on March 21, 2022, during the Siege of Mariupol. Three original works by Kuindzhi were not in the museum at the time, but works by other artists were.

History
The creation of a museum in Mariupol dedicated to Arkhip Kuindzhi was first suggested in 1914. A potential donation of works from the Kuindzhi Society of Artists was proposed, but the First World War delayed decision-making. Serious consideration to the construction of a museum was once again made in the 1960s, but funding was unavailable for a museum and the Kuindzhi Exhibition Centre opened instead. In 1997 premises were donated and renovation began in 2008.

The museum opened on 30 October 2010 as a branch of the Mariupol Museum of Local Lore. It is housed in a building that was constructed in 1902 as a wedding gift for the wife of the founder of the Real School, Valentina Gadzinova. In 2015 the museum celebrated the 175th anniversary of the birth of its namesake. In 2019 the French ambassador to Ukraine, Isabelle Dumont, visited the museum, praising its work.

The museum was destroyed by an airstrike on March 21, 2022, during the Siege of Mariupol. Three original works by Kuindzhi were not in the museum at the time, but works by other artists were. On the other hand, the fate of paintings by other artists is unknown: Ivan Aivazovsky, Mykola Hlushchenko, Tetyana Yablonska, Mykhailo Deregus, Andrii Kotska, Mykola Bendryk, Leonid Gadi.

Collections and research
The art collection includes 650 paintings, 960 graphic works, 150 sculptures and over 300 decorative art objects. Much of this collection was developed by the Mariupol Museum of Local History during the twentieth century.

Three original works by Kuindzhi were held at the museum, as well as copies of his works. The original works are the sketches Red West, Autumn – Crimea and Elbrus, donated by the State Russian Museum to the local history museum in Mariupol (then known as Zhdanov after a Soviet functionary) in the 1960s. Their current whereabouts are unknown.

The museum also holds papers relating to the life of Kuindzhi, as well as a copy of his 1841 Ukrainian birth certificate. It includes the work of other artists, such as Victoria Kovalchuk who exhibited there, as well as Ivan Aivazovsky, Vasily Vereshchagin, Ivan Shishkin, amongst others.

The museum has provided evidence to support an 1841 date for Kuindzhi's birth, which has been the subject of debate due to contrasting evidence. This debate was played out between Russian and Ukrainian Wikipedias.

Gallery

See also
 Mariupol Museum of Local Lore
 Kuindzhi Center for Contemporary Art and Culture

References

External links
 Arkhip Kuindzhi, Part 1 – Virtual Museum Tour on YouTube
 Kuindzhi Art Museum, Mariupol, description and photos
 The museum director was shocked when she saw what her colleague was doing

2010 establishments in Ukraine
2022 disestablishments in Ukraine
Museums established in 2010
Museums disestablished in 2022
Art museums and galleries in Ukraine
Biographical museums in Ukraine
Defunct museums in Ukraine
Museums devoted to one artist
Museums in Mariupol
Buildings and structures destroyed during the 2022 Russian invasion of Ukraine
Culture in Mariupol
Attacks on museums